Janet Haas (born June 28, 1953) is an American former professional tennis player.

The first female tennis player to receive a sports scholarship to the University of Miami, Haas was ranked as high as fourth in the national collegiate rankings. She was the University of Miami's Women's Athlete of the Year in 1973 and is a member of their Sports Hall of Fame.

While touring on the professional circuit she featured in the main draws of the French Open, Wimbledon, and the US Open. She was a quarter-finalist at the 1973 U.S. Clay Court Championships and won a silver medal at the 1973 Maccabiah Games.

References

External links
 
 

1953 births
Living people
American female tennis players
Miami Hurricanes women's tennis players
Jewish tennis players
Tennis players from Miami
Jewish American sportspeople
Competitors at the 1973 Maccabiah Games
Maccabiah Games medalists in tennis
Maccabiah Games silver medalists for the United States
21st-century American Jews
21st-century American women